American Adobo is a 2002 Filipino romantic comedy film directed by Laurice Guillen and starring Cherry Pie Picache, Traci Ann Wolfe, Christopher de Leon, Dina Bonnevie, Ricky Davao, Paolo Montalban, Randy Becker, and Sandy Andolong. The screenplay was written by Vincent Nebrida. It tells the story of five Filipino-American friends living in New York City dealing with love, sex, friendship, careers, and cultural identity. The title was derived from adobo, a very popular dish in the Philippines. The film was released on January 16, 2002 in the Philippines and January 25 in the United States.

Plot
Tere Sanchez (Cherry Pie Picache) is an accountant who is in her early forties, single, and not especially happy about it. Tere is an excellent cook, and often throws dinner parties for her friends, and the arrival of her old friend Lorna (Sol Oca) from Manila is all the reason she needs to invite her friends over for a feast. Mike (Christopher De Leon) is a former political journalist who is now enjoying the fruits of a lucrative career as a newspaper editor, but he wonders if he left his principles behind along the way; he's also feeling unfulfilled in his marriage to Gigi (Susan Valdez-LeGoff). Gerry (Ricky Davao) is an advertising copywriter who is afraid to tell his friends and family that he's gay, though circumstances may well drive him out of the closet. Raul (Paolo Montalban) is a good-looking womaniser who prefers to date Caucasians, and lacks a certain amount of emotional maturity. And Marissa (Dina Bonnevie) is on the surface a well-to-do social butterfly; however, deep inside she's woefully insecure, and is afraid to confront her boyfriend Sam (Randy Becker) about his constant infidelity. Meanwhile, Lorna confesses that while she's married to a wealthy man in Manila, she's terribly unhappy, and is considering staying in America as an illegal alien.

Cast

Main roles
 Christopher de Leon as Mike
 Dina Bonnevie as Marissa
 Ricky Davao as Gerry
 Cherry Pie Picache as Tere
 Paolo Montalban as Raul
 Randy Becker as Sam
 Keesha Sharp as Debbie
 Sandy Andolong as Emma

Supporting roles
 Gloria Romero as Gerry's Mom
 Susan Valdez-LeGoff as Gigi Manalastas
 Sol Oca as Lorna
 Wayne Maugans as Chris
 Martha Millan as Candy Manalastas
 Lordi Villanueva as Lydia
 Jojo Gonzales as Frank
 Luis Pedron as Nonong
 Jason Verdadero as Mark
 Marcel Simoneau as Sal
 Traci Ann Wolfe as Denise

Symbolism
Adobo is a very popular dish in the Philippines and aside from being a hearty viand in the film, it also serves as a symbolism of the clashes in the different struggles of the characters. Acidic vinegar, salty soy sauce, meat, salt, pepper, all are combined in a pot to produce adobo. In the film, despite the conflicts in their characters, in the end, everything ended up well, just like a well cooked adobo.

Production
The film started out with a conversation in 1995 between Tony Gloria and Vincent Nebrida that there should be films depicting Filipino life in the US. Two months later Vincent finished a screenplay called "Magic Adobo" but only received attention from movie executives in April 1999, after four years since its conception. The entire movie was filmed in chilly October 2000 on location in Manhattan, Brooklyn, Queens, and Long Island, including a summertime pool party scene which required the actors, who were shivering between takes, to wear skimpy bathing suits outdoors. The scenes were filmed over a span of twenty days.

Release
The film has been Rated-R by the MPAA for sexual situations, nudity and strong language.

Box office
The film had a very limited release in the United States on January 25, 2002 in 7 theaters for 3 consecutive days. The crew acquired a Mayor's permit to shut down the Queensboro Bridge for the premiere night of the film.

The film was released on VHS and on DVD on May 30, 2003 by First Look Pictures. The DVD featured an English and Spanish subtitles.

Critical response
On review aggregator Rotten Tomatoes, the film holds a rating of 30% based on 23 reviews, and an average rating of 4.6 out of 10. The site's consensus states: "The characters and situations seem borrowed from overwrought sitcoms."  On Metacritic it has a weighted average score of 30 out of 100 based on 10 reviews, indicating "generally unfavorable reviews".

John Anderson of the New York Newsday stated that "American Adobo is a tasty dish of a movie. A tender film with genuine insight into the urban heart. The way it treats the totally non-ethnic aspects of life--love, loneliness, dying, friendship--is what makes this Filipino film so attractive and also so American." Kevin Thomas of the Los Angeles Times stated that, "American Adobo is an intimate, good-humored comedy with lots of heart. Delicious and very funny!"  while Andy Klein of San Francisco Weekly stated that, "American Adobo is sophisticated and entertaining. A solid step forward for the emerging Philippine-American cinema." Oliver Carnay of Asian Journal stated that "[the film] is rich, funny and entertaining. A gem reminiscent of Eat Drink Man Woman." The National Board Review was also very positive about the film saying, "A wonderful movie with a lot of heart. Among the year's top foreign language films" while Stephen Holden of The New York Times was less positive about the film stating that, "American Adobo certainly doesn't lack emotional energy, but it has two or three more plots than it can handle and plays like a compressed, strident soap opera."

Accolades

Official selection
 2002 San Diego Asian Film Festival
 2002 Los Angeles Cinema Indios Festival
 2003 Women's International Film Festival, South Korea
 2003 Fukuoka International Film Festival, Japan

Los Angeles Cinema Indios Festival
 Winner best actor for Christopher De Leon
 Winner special achievement award

Star Awards
 Nominated best actor for Ricky Davao
 Nominated best new actor for Paolo Montalban

FAMAS Awards
 Winner best supporting actress for Cherry Pie Picache

Gawad Urian Awards
 Nominated best actor for Ricky Davao
 Nominated best actress for Cherry Pie Picache
 Nominated best actress for Dina Bonnevie
 Nominated best director for Laurice Guillen

Filipino Heritage Awards
 Winner most promising talent, Paolo Montalban

Extreme Awards
 Nominated best picture

References

External links
 Official
 
 
 

Star Cinema films
2000s Tagalog-language films
Films about Filipino Americans
Films set in the United States
Films about immigration to the United States
Philippine LGBT-related films
Asian-American LGBT-related films
Comedy films about Asian Americans
Films shot in New York City
Films set in New York City
2000s English-language films
Films directed by Laurice Guillen
2000s American films